Llanwnda is a village, community and electoral ward in Gwynedd, Wales. The community has a population of 1,994 as taken at the 2011 Census.  It is situated about 3 miles to the south of Caernarfon, and 5 miles south-west of Llanrug. According to the 2011 Census, 81.6% of the population were Welsh speakers. The image on the right is of Glanrhyd, Llanwnda, not the village of Llanwnda less than a mile to the south. The community includes the slate mining villages of Rhosgadfan and Rhostryfan.

References

External links 

www.geograph.co.uk : photos of Llanwnda and surrounding area

 
Villages in Gwynedd
Communities in Gwynedd